Isoeugenol is a phenylpropene, a propenyl-substituted guaiacol. A phenylpropanoid, it occurs in the essential oils of plants such as ylang-ylang (Cananga odorata), and is a component of wood smoke and liquid smoke. It can be synthesized from eugenol and has been used in the manufacture of vanillin. It may occur as either the cis (Z) or trans (E) isomer. Trans (E) isoeugenol is crystalline while cis (Z) isoeugenol is a liquid.  Isoeugenol is one of several phenolic compounds responsible for the mold-inhibiting effect of smoke on meats and cheeses.

Allergy
Some individuals experience a hives-like reaction to long-term exposure to Isoeugenol, which is named as Fragrance in the ingredients of consumer products such as soaps, shampoos and detergents, bath tissue, and topical cosmetic applications. Sensitivity to isoeugenol (Fragrance) may be identified with a clinical patch test.

See also
 Pseudoisoeugenol
 Methylisoeugenol
 Desmethylisoeugenol

References 

Phenylpropenes
O-methylated natural phenols